The Newman family is one of the core families on the American soap opera, The Young and the Restless, which is set in the fictional town of Genoa City, Wisconsin. They were introduced in February 1980, when Victor Newman arrived in town. Eventually, Victor was paired with Nicole Reed, who has notably become the family's prominent matriarch, having been married to Victor four times. The family is currently represented by Victor, Nikki and his four living children: Victoria, Nicholas, Abby and Adam Newman. The family is also well known for its long-standing feud with the Abbott family. The Newmans run the multinational conglomerate Newman Enterprises. They have lived at their ranch for three decades.

Family members

First generation
Albert Miller (George Kennedy)(deceased as of 2003) – Matt and Christian's father, who abandoned his family, causing his son to be raised in an orphanage. After years of him being missing, Victor and his son Nicholas flew to Canada to pay him one last hostile visit in November 2003.
Cora Miller (Dorothy McGuire)(deceased as of 1984) – Victor's mother. She appeared on the series in June 1984, while dying. Victor brought her to the ranch to spend her final days. She met her granddaughter Victoria. Cora passes away on July 25, 1984.

Second generation
 Victor Christian Newman Sr. (Eric Braeden)Patriarch. Victor was born Christian Miller under poor and struggling conditions. Since the age of 7, he had grown up in an orphanage. His mother promised to return for him but never did, and he ran away as a teenager with nothing. He became a successful billionaire business tycoon. He arrived in Genoa City in 1980 to run Chancellor Industries for Katherine Chancellor, who hired him. He now runs his own company Newman Enterprises. He is the father of Victoria, Nicholas, Adam, and Abby Newman.
Matt Miller (Robert Parucha) – Matt is the brother of Victor. He lived in Genoa City from 1985 - 1987 before moving away. He reprised his role in 2003 when he alerted Victor that their father was nearing death and again February 18–19, 2020, when he attended a 40 Anniversary tribute to his brother, Victor.

Third generation
 Victoria Nicole Newman (Amelia Heinle)Victor's daughter with Nicole Reed. Victoria has worked for the family company numerous times over the years and has been chief executive officer multiple times. She is the mother of Reed Hellstrom and Katie Newman, and the adoptive mother of Johnny Abbott.
 Nicholas "Nick" Christian Newman (Joshua Morrow)Victor's son with Nicole Reed. Nick has also worked at Newman Enterprises, but has tried to break away from his father by co-creating his own magazine Restless Style. He lives on the Newman ranch. He has an adopted daughter, Cassie, a legal son, Christian, and three biological children – Noah, Summer, and Faith Newman.
 Victor Adam Newman Jr. (Mark Grossman) Victor's son with Hope Adams. Adam grew up with his mother in Kansas without knowledge of Victor being his father. He was brought back into Victor's life in 2008 as an adult, following Hope's death. Adam plotted revenge against the Newmans, and has had an extremely bad relationship with his paternal family. He is a businessman having attended Harvard Business School, and has worked at Newman Enterprises. He is the father of Connor and Christian Newman.
 Abigail "Abby" Rachel Newman (Melissa Ordway), Victor's daughter with Ashley Abbott. Growing up, Abby was thought to be the daughter of Brad Carlton, but eventually found out she was Victor's daughter. As a young adult, she gained notoriety in the media as the "Naked Heiress". She currently resides in Genoa City.

Fourth generation
 Cassidy "Cassie" Ann Newman (Camryn Grimes)Nick's adopted daughter with Sharon Collins. She's the daughter of Sharon and Frank Barritt. As a young teen, Sharon was unable to care for Cassie, and subsequently gave her up for adoption. When Sharon married Nick, the two found Cassie, and Nick adopted her. In 2005, Cassie died as a result of driving with a drunken Daniel Romalotti.
 Noah Christian Newman (Rory Gibson)Nick's son with Sharon Collins. Growing up, he dealt with Cassie's death and the divorce of his parents. Noah became a rebellious teen, and had a relationship with Eden Baldwin. He was a musician and is currently a bartender.
 Summer Ann Newman (Hunter King)Nick's daughter with Phyllis Summers. She was kidnapped as an infant by Sheila Carter along with Fenmore Baldwin, one of her closest friends. In 2013, it was believed that she was the biological daughter of Jack Abbott, but it was revealed that Sharon tampered with the results, and Nick is her father.
 Reed Newman Hellstrom (Tristan Lake Leabu)Victoria's son with J.T. Hellstrom. He moved to D.C. with J.T. in 2010, having made numerous visits since. He returned to Genoa City in 2016 to stay with his mother.
 Faith Cassidy Newman (Alyvia Alyn Lind) Nick's daughter with Sharon Collins. Faith's birth was predicted by Cassie on her death bed. She was switched at birth with Ashley Abbott's stillborn daughter, also named Faith, but Nick and Sharon were reunited with her.
 John "Johnny" Abbott IV  Victoria's adopted son with Billy Abbott. He is Billy's son with Chelsea Lawson, and Chelsea let Victoria adopt Johnny after he was born.
 Connor Adam Newman (Judah Mackey) Adam's son with Chelsea Lawson. Chelsea initially claimed that Dylan McAvoy was the father, but Adam eventually discovered the truth.
 Katherine "Katie" Rose Abbott Newman  Victoria's daughter with Billy Abbott. When she was first born, Victoria was uncertain whether Billy or Stitch Rayburn was the father.
 Christian Andrew Newman  Adam's son with Sage Warner, and the legal son of Nick. Sage claimed Nick was the father, and Adam kept the secret. He was switched at birth with Sullivan "Sully" McAvoy. After both Adam and Sage's deaths, Nick discovered "Sully" was Christian and took him back, raising him alone.
 Dominic Phillip Abbott Newman Winters Chancellor (Rainn and River Ware)Abby's son with Devon Hamilton, and the legal son of Chance Chancellor. Chance was unable to have children, and Abby couldn't carry a child after her miscarriage years prior, so Devon volunteered to be the sperm donor with Mariah Copeland being the surrogate.

In-laws
 Julia Newman –  Victor's wife (1977–81)
 Nicole Reed – Matriarch, Victor's wife (1984–88, 2002–08, 2013—)
 Leanna Love – Victor's wife (1988)
 Ashley Abbott – Victor's wife (1990–93, 2009)
 Hope Wilson – Victor's wife (1994–95)
 Diane Jenkins – Victor's wife (1997–99, 2011)
 Sabrina Costelana – Victor's wife (2008)
 Sharon Collins – Victor's wife (2012); Nick's wife (1995, 1996–2007); Adam's wife (2009–10)
 Ryan McNeil – Victoria's husband (1992–93)
 Cole Howard – Victoria's husband (1994–98)
 Brad Carlton – Victoria's husband (2006–07)
 J.T. Hellstrom – Victoria's husband (2008–10)
 Billy Abbott – Victoria's husband (2010–14)
 Phyllis Summers – Nick's wife (2007–10, 2012–13)
Sage Warner – Nick's wife (2015–16)
 Skye Lockhart –  Adam's wife (2010)
 Chelsea Lawson –  Adam's wife (2012–13, 2014–16)
Stitch Rayburn –  Abby's husband (2015–16)
 Austin Travers – Summer's husband (2014–15)
 Kyle Abbott – Summer's husband (2019)
 Chance Chancellor – Abby's husband (2020–)

Family tree

Descendants

Albert Miller (died 2003); married Cora Miller (deceased)
Victor Newman; Albert and Cora's son; married Julia Newman (1970–81), Nicole Reed (1984–88, 1998, 2002–08, 2013–), Leanna Love (1988), Ashley Abbott (1990–93, 2009), Hope Adams (1994–95), Diane Jenkins (1997–99, 2011), Sabrina Costelana (2008), Meggie McClaine (2010), Sharon Newman (2012, 2012)
Victoria Newman; Victor and Nikki's daughter; married Ryan McNeil (1992–93), Cole Howard (1994, 1994–98), Brad Carlton (2006–07), J.T. Hellstrom (2008–10), Billy Abbott (2010–14)
Eve Howard (1998); Victoria and Cole's daughter
Reed Hellstrom (1999–); Victoria and J.T.'s son
Johnny Abbott (2012–); Victoria's adopted son with Billy
Katie Newman (2013–); Victoria and Billy's daughter
Nicholas Newman; Victor and Nikki's son; married Sharon Collins (1995, 1996–2007), Phyllis Summers (2007–10, 2012–13), Sage Warner (2015–16)
Cassie Newman (1991–2005); Nick's adopted daughter with Sharon
Noah Newman (1992–); Nick and Sharon's son
Summer Newman (1993–); Nick and Phyllis' daughter; married Austin Travers (2014–15), Kyle Abbott (2019, 2021–)
Faith Newman (2006–); Nick and Sharon's daughter
Christian Newman (2015–); Nick's legal son with Sage
Adam Newman (1984–); Victor and Hope's son; married Sharon Newman (2009–10), Skye Lockhart (2010), Chelsea Lawson (2012–13, 2014–16)
Connor Newman (2013–); Adam and Chelsea's son
Christian Newman (2015–); Adam's son with Sage Warner
Abby Newman (1988–); Victor and Ashley's daughter; married Ben Rayburn (2015–16), Chance Chancellor (2020–)
Dominic Abbott Newman Chancellor (2021-); Abby's biological son with Devon Hamilton; legal son of Chance. 
Matt Miller; Albert and Cora's son

Newman Enterprises

Newman Enterprises is a worldwide conglomerate founded by Victor Newman in 1980. In 2013, it became known as Newman-Chancellor Industries, following the death of Katherine Chancellor and the merger of Newman Enterprises and Chancellor Industries until Chancellor Industries was sold to Jill Abbott and Cane Ashby in 2015. After that, it was briefly known as Newman-Abbott Enterprises following a merger with Jabot Cosmetics, until the merger was undone and the two companies separated, making it Newman Enterprises once again.

Newman Enterprises

Newman Enterprises was a worldwide conglomerate founded in 1980 by Victor Newman, following his departure from Chancellor Industries. The company operated with three divisions: Real Estate, Cosmetics and Venture Capital; and numerous subsidiaries. Throughout the company's history, its main rival has been Jabot Cosmetics.

For years, Newman's chief rival in the cosmetics industry was Jabot Cosmetics but after it went public Victor bought up most of the stock and acquired the company. For years Victor was chairman of the board and CEO with Jack Abbott, Brad Carlton, Jill Foster Abbott, Ashley Abbott, and Neil Winters all serving as underlings. Jack, Brad, and Neil served as coCEO but only short term as Victor always intended to pass Newman Enterprises on to his children. This caused longtime employee Neil Winters to resign and become CEO of Chancellor Industries.

For years Victor as chairman and CEO ruthlessly ran Newman Enterprises and made it one of the largest and most successful conglomerates in the world. Both Victoria and Nicholas worked their way up at Newman Enterprises to eventually become board members and CEO's respectively. After the death of Victor's ex-wife Hope Wilson Victor invited his younger son Victor Adam Newman, Jr. to come work at Newman Enterprises. Adam was a Harvard-educated Wall Street stockbroker and inherited much of Victor's business savvy but his ambition and jealousy put him at odds with Victor and his siblings but Adam served briefly as chairman of the board and CEO and managed to retain a seat on the board after Newman Enterprises went public.

For years Newman Enterprises was a private company but after his daughters Victoria and Abby and eldest son Nicholas successfully sued Victor for $1.5 billion Victor took the company public. Despite this Victor forgave his children and they have returned to work at Newman Enterprises.

Since the lawsuit, there have been many changes in Newman Enterprises in terms of CEO. When Victor was jailed, Adam Newman took on the roll of CEO, but Victor later returned. A few months later, Victor disappeared because of mental health issues, and his then-wife, Sharon Newman took over the role of CEO out of revenge towards the Newmans, mainly Victor, Nicholas, Victoria, Abby, Adam and Nikki. A court ruling made Victoria Newman acting CEO while Sharon underwent court ordered psychological evaluation, but the decision was reversed soon after. Sharon's tenure as CEO saw stocks at Newman plummet, but her term ended once Victor returned alive retaking control of his company. Due to the plummet in stocks, Tucker McCall conspired with Jack Abbott in a hostile takeover to control Newman Enterprises. They purchased significant stock. With Tucker's support, Jack was successful in his bid to become CEO. Jack fired Victor, Victoria, and Nicholas as he planned to change the face of the company by renaming it "Abbott Enterprises". Jack became addicted to painkillers but covered-up with help from Adam Newman.

Jack resigned as CEO and Adam convinced the board to appoint him CEO. Victor began plotting a takeover but when Adam was shot defending Victor they agreed to work together. Adam raises enough money from an anonymous source to buy out the remaining stockholders and the Newmans retake complete control of Newman Enterprises. Victor discovers that Adam's secret investor that allowed the Newmans to retake control of Newman Enterprises was Jack Abbott; this causes a rift between Victor and Adam in which Adam signs over his shares in the company to Victor. Upon the death of Victor's close friend Katherine Chancellor, Victor inherits majority ownership of Chancellor Industries and immediately plans a merger between Chancellor Industries and Newman Enterprises with Victoria heading the project.  The new company emerged with the name Newman-Chancellor Industries.

Divisions
 Brash and Sassy Cosmetics
 Newman Energy
 Drilling 
 Transportation
 Refining and marketing 
 Newman Real Estate 
 "Castle Properties" 
 "Gerolamo Limited"
 Newman Venture Capitals 
 "Ra-Tech" 
 "Granville Global" 
 "NVP Retreats"

Personnel

Current personnel
 Linda Helgesson (member of the board of directors) 
 Abby Newman (shareholder, member of the board of directors; former chief operating officer) 
 Nicholas Newman (shareholder, member of the board of directors; former co-chief executive officer, chief operating officer, chief executive officer, and executive)  
 Nikki Newman (member of the board of directors) 
 Summer Newman (intern)
 Victor Newman (founder; chief executive officer (CEO); chairman of the board) 
 Victoria Newman (shareholder, member of the board of directors; former chief executive officer (CEO); former chief operating officer, and president of Brash & Sassy; formerly worked in the mailroom)
 Natalie Soderberg (executive assistant) 
 Grace Turner (executive)   ·

Former personnel
 Bob Adams (former member of the board of directors) 
 Billy Abbott (former acting co-CEO) 
 Jack Abbott (former CEO)  
 Kyle Abbott (former executive) 
 Lauren Fenmore Baldwin (former member of the board of directors) 
 Michael Baldwin (former member of the board of directors, former general and legal counsel) 
 Brad Carlton (former chief operating officer, executive, member of the board of directors and chief executive officer) 
 Colleen Carlton (former member of the board of directors) 
 Avery Bailey Clark (former chief legal counsel) 
 Melanie Daniels (legal counsel)
 Curtis Fielding (former member of the board of directors) 
 Devon Hamilton (former intern) 
 JT Hellstrom (former director of security) 
 Davis Holloway (former member of the board of directors) 
 Diane Jenkins (former architect, consultant and member of the board of directors) 
 Tucker McCall (former member of the board of directors) 
 Ryan McNeil (former assistant to Victor Newman; formerly worked at Brash & Sassy, Newman Men's Line and mailroom) 
 Carmen Mesta (former public relations officer) 
 Adam Newman (former shareholder, member of the board of directors; former CEO of Chelsea 2.0, co-chief executive officer, chief executive officer, chief financial officer, Junior vice president, executive) 
 Chelsea Newman (former executive; in charge of Chelsea 2.0) 
 Noah Newman (former intern) 
 Alex Perez (former general counsel)
 Daniel Romalotti (former Intern)
 Luca Santori (former shareholder, former executive)
 Marisa Sierras (former executive assistant)
 Mitchell Sherman (former general counsel) 
 John Silva (former general counsel) 
 Phyllis Summers (former director of Internet affairs and vice president of research and development) 
 Karen Taylor (former director of marketing and director of Consolidated Cosmetics Division) 
 Sage Warner (former executive at Chelsea 2.0)
 Connie Wayne (Victor's former secretary) 
 Mason Wilder (former executive assistant to Jack Abbott and Adam Newman)
 Christine Blair Williams (former general counsel) 
 Drucilla Winters (former director of Consolidated Cosmetics Division) 
 Neil Winters (former chief executive officer and member of the board of directors; former chief operation officer and mentor to Drucilla Winters; former acting chief executive officer and corporate liaison)

The Newman ranch

Victor and his wife at the time, Julia Newman, bought the Newman ranch from Katherine Chancellor in 1980. According to Jamey Giddens of Daytime Confidential, it is one of the show's most "iconic sets". In October 2012, during a mental breakdown, Sharon Newman drank at the Newman ranch. She ended up setting the curtains at the ranch on fire, burning down the mainhouse completely. Adam Newman took her away into hiding immediately.

List of the Newman staff:
Newman upstairs maid: Bonnie
Newman cook: Vera
Newman former house manager: Estella Munoz (Anne Betancourt)
Newman former houseman: Miguel Rodriguez (Anthony Pena)
Newman former houseman: Charlie
Newman former maid: Ellie
Newman jet pilots: Wally, Kenny
Newman jet steward: Henry
Newman former corporate attorneys: Mitchell Sherman (William Wintersole), Christine Blair (Lauralee Bell), Michael Baldwin (Christian LeBlanc) Melanie Daniels
Newman former personal attorneys: John Silva (John Castellanos) Avery Bailey Clark
Victor's secretary: Connie Wayne (Lise Simms)
Adam's former personal assistant: Mason Wilder
Diane's former secretary: Trudy
Diane's former personal assistant: Marissa Barton
Faith's nanny: Amy

External links
 Soapcentral – Newman family

Notes

The Young and the Restless families
The Young and the Restless characters